Ilex macrocarpa is a species of flowering plant in the holly family Aquifoliaceae, native to central and southern China, and Vietnam. It differs from other hollies by its large black fruit. It is used as a street tree in Hefei, China.

Subtaxa
The following varieties are accepted:
Ilex macrocarpa var. longipedunculata  – southern China
Ilex macrocarpa var. macrocarpa – entire range
Ilex macrocarpa var. reevesiae  – central China

References

macrocarpa
Flora of North-Central China
Flora of South-Central China
Flora of Southeast China
Flora of Vietnam
Plants described in 1888